The 2008 Asian Fencing Championships was held in Bangkok, Thailand from 24 April to 29 April 2008.

Medal summary

Men

Women

Medal table

References

FIE Archive Results

External links
Official website

Asian Championship
F
Asian Fencing Championships
International fencing competitions hosted by Thailand